Malcolm Francis Marsh (born September 24, 1928) is an American attorney and jurist from the state of Oregon. He is an inactive Senior United States district judge of the United States District Court for the District of Oregon in Portland, Oregon. A native of Oregon, he served as an active judge for eleven years, and was in private legal practice in Salem before that.

Early life

Marsh was born in Portland, Oregon, on September 24, 1928, the son of lawyer Francis Marsh. His father's twin brother was Eugene E. Marsh, onetime Speaker of the Oregon House of Representatives and President of the Oregon State Senate. Both brothers served as president of the Oregon State Bar. The family moved to McMinnville southwest of Portland in 1935. In 1946, he joined the United States Army and served as a corporal in Japan until discharge in 1947.

Professional career

After returning to Oregon, he enrolled at the University of Oregon in Eugene where he graduated with a Bachelor of Science degree in 1951. Marsh then attended the University of Oregon School of Law, and graduated in 1954 with a Bachelor of Laws. In 1953, he married the former Shari Long, and they had three children. After graduating from law school, Marsh entered private practice in McMinnville, working for his father. Later in 1954 he moved to Salem where he partnered with Ned Clark and specialized as a trial attorney in products liability. He was inducted into the American College of Trial Lawyers in 1979. In 1983, he was named Salem's First Citizen.

Federal judicial service

While in Salem he became friends with later United States Senator Mark Hatfield in the 1950s, and remained in private practice in the city until 1987. The friendship with Hatfield helped lead to President Ronald Reagan nominating Marsh for a judgeship on the United States District Court for the District of Oregon in 1987 after Edward Leavy moved to the Ninth Circuit. Nominated on February 2, 1987, he was confirmed by the United States Senate on March 20, 1987 and received his commission on March 24, 1987, for the Portland-based court. On April 16, 1998, Marsh took senior status.

Notable cases

Marsh oversaw the legal proceedings by the federal government against the State of Oregon over the Fairview Training Center in Salem in the late 1980s. In 1989 and 1990 he presided over two lawsuits by the NBA against the Oregon Lottery over the lottery's Sports Action games. He also was the judge in several legal proceedings in the late 1980s and early 1990s over logging on federal lands.

In February 1992, the Oregon Republican Party sued the Oregon Secretary of State to force all Oregon Senate seats to be contested in the 1992 election following redistricting from the 1990 Census. Marsh heard the case and ruled for the state, saying the state did not need to hold all the elections in one year and could retain the staggered system. Later in 1992, he presided over the lawsuit against the Vernonia School District for the district's random drug testing policy. In the case, Marsh ruled the testing policy was constitutional, but was overturned by the United States Circuit Court for the Ninth Circuit, which in turn was overturned on appeal by the Supreme Court.

Over several years Marsh presided over several cases concerning salmon. This included later oversight of the Sohappy v. Smith case concerning tribal rights to salmon runs in the Pacific Northwest. He also heard the first challenges to the dams on the Columbia River under the Endangered Species Act after some salmon runs were listed as endangered.

Marsh presided over the 1995 trial of several former followers of the Bhagwan Shree Rajneesh after their failed assassination plot against U.S. Attorney for Oregon Charles H. Turner. Turner had investigated the Rajneeshees and their activities including their bioterror attack. At trial two Rajneeshees were found guilty in the plot and Marsh sentenced them to five years in prison. He later sentenced another conspirator to five years of probation for their role in the plot.

Marsh was the main person from the judiciary involved with the design of the new Mark O. Hatfield United States Courthouse. He worked with the General Services Administration to design the 16-story, and nearly $130 million building to ensure adequate space for 30 years. In 1997, he oversaw the move of the court to the new Hatfield Courthouse.

References

External links

Cases filed in the Oregon District Court before Malcolm F. Marsh

1928 births
Living people
People from McMinnville, Oregon
Lawyers from Portland, Oregon
University of Oregon alumni
University of Oregon School of Law alumni
Politicians from Salem, Oregon
Judges of the United States District Court for the District of Oregon
United States district court judges appointed by Ronald Reagan
20th-century American judges
Lawyers from Salem, Oregon
21st-century American judges